Tarakeswar Assembly constituency is an assembly constituency in Hooghly district in the Indian state of West Bengal.

Overview
As per orders of the Delimitation Commission, No. 198 Tarakeswar Assembly constituency, also spelt Tarakeshwar, is composed of the following: Tarakeswar Municipality, Tarakeswar community development block, and Bhanderhati I, Bhanderhati II, Gopinathpur I, Gopinathpur II and Perambua Sahabazar gram panchayats of Dhaniakhali community development block.

Tarakeswar Assembly constituency is part of No. 29 Arambagh (Lok Sabha constituency) (SC).

Members of Vidhan Sabha

 In some years Marxist Forward Bloc candidates ran on Independent or CPI(M) tickets.

Election results

2021 election

2016 election

2011
In the 2011 election, Rachpal Singh of Trinamool Congress defeated his nearest rival Pratim Chatterjee of MFB.

  

 

.# Trinamool Congress did not contest this seat in 2006.

2006
In the 2006 election, Pratim Chatterjee of CPIM-Marxist Forward Bloc Supported Independent defeated his nearest rival Krishna Bhattacharje of BJP.

  

.# Trinamool Congress+BJP alliance contested this seat in 2006.

2001
In the 2001 election, Pratim Chatterjee of CPIM-Marxist Forward Bloc Supported Independent defeated his nearest rival Krishna Bhattacharje of BJP.

  

.# Trinamool Congress+Trinamool Congress alliance contested this seat in 2001.

1977-2006
Tarakeswar has been a base of Marxist Forward Bloc but officially their candidates are often shown as Independent. In 1996, the candidate was shown as belonging to CPI(M). In 2006, 2001 and 1996, Pratim Chatterjee, Independent/ CPI(M), won the 185 Tarakeswar assembly seat defeating Krishna Bhattacharjee of BJP in 2006, Mohan Ghosh of Congress in 2001 and Ajit Kumar Ghosh of Congress in 1996. Contests in most years were multi cornered but only winners and runners are being mentioned. Santi Chatterjee, Independent, defeated Balailal Sheth of Congress in 1991 and 1987. Ram Chatterjee, Independent, defeated Bimal Kanti Ghosh of ICS in 1982. and Ajit Bose Mullik of Janata Party in 1977.

1951-1972
Balai Lal Sheth of Congress won in 1972. Ram Chatterjee of Marxist Forward Block/ Independent won in 1971, 1969 and 1967. Parbati Charan Hazra of Congress won in 1962, 1957 and in independent India's first election in 1951.

References

Assembly constituencies of West Bengal
Politics of Hooghly district